Capsaicin (8-methyl-N-vanillyl-6-nonenamide) ( or ) is an active component of chili peppers, which are plants belonging to the genus Capsicum. It is a chemical irritant and neurotoxin for mammals, including humans, and produces a sensation of burning in any tissue with which it comes into contact. Capsaicin and several related alkaloids are called capsaicinoids and are produced as secondary metabolites by chili peppers, probably as deterrents against certain mammals and fungi. Pure capsaicin is a hydrophobic, colorless, highly pungent, crystalline to waxy solid compound.

Natural function
Capsaicin is present in large quantities in the placental tissue (which holds the seeds), the internal membranes and, to a lesser extent, the other fleshy parts of the fruits of plants in the genus Capsicum.  The seeds themselves do not produce any capsaicin, although the highest concentration of capsaicin can be found in the white pith of the inner wall, where the seeds are attached.

The seeds of Capsicum plants are dispersed predominantly by birds. In birds, the TRPV1 channel does not respond to capsaicin or related chemicals (avian vs. mammalian TRPV1 show functional diversity and selective sensitivity).  This is advantageous to the plant, as chili pepper seeds consumed by birds pass through the digestive tract and can germinate later, whereas mammals have molar teeth which destroy such seeds and prevent them from germinating.  Thus, natural selection may have led to increasing capsaicin production because it makes the plant less likely to be eaten by animals that do not help it disperse. There is also evidence that capsaicin may have evolved as an anti-fungal agent. The fungal pathogen Fusarium, which is known to infect wild chilies and thereby reduce seed viability, is deterred by capsaicin, which thus limits this form of predispersal seed mortality.

The vanillotoxin-containing venom of a certain tarantula species (Psalmopoeus cambridgei, also known as the Trinidad chevron tarantula) activates the same pathway of pain as is activated by capsaicin, an example of a shared pathway in both plant and animal anti-mammalian defense.

Uses

Food

Because of the burning sensation caused by capsaicin when it comes in contact with mucous membranes, it is commonly used in food products to provide added spiciness or "heat" (piquancy), usually in the form of spices such as chili powder and paprika. In high concentrations, capsaicin will also cause a burning effect on other sensitive areas, such as skin or eyes. The degree of heat found within a food is often measured on the Scoville scale.

There has long been a demand for capsaicin-spiced products like chili pepper, and hot sauces such as Tabasco sauce and Mexican salsa. It is common for people to experience pleasurable and even euphoric effects from ingesting capsaicin.  Folklore among self-described "chiliheads" attribute this to pain-stimulated release of endorphins, a different mechanism from the local receptor overload that makes capsaicin effective as a topical analgesic.

Research and pharmaceutical use
Capsaicin is used as an analgesic in topical ointments and dermal patches to relieve pain, typically in concentrations between 0.025% and 0.1%. It may be applied in cream form for the temporary relief of minor aches and pains of muscles and joints associated with arthritis, backache, strains and sprains, often in compounds with other rubefacients.

It is also used to reduce the symptoms of peripheral neuropathy, such as post-herpetic neuralgia caused by shingles. A capsaicin transdermal patch (Qutenza) for the management of this particular therapeutic indication (pain due to post-herpetic neuralgia) was approved in 2009, as a therapeutic by both the U.S. Food and Drug Administration (FDA) and the European Union. A subsequent application to the FDA for Qutenza to be used as an analgesic in HIV neuralgia was refused. One 2017 review of clinical studies having limited quality found that high-dose topical capsaicin (8%) compared with control (0.4% capsaicin) provided moderate to substantial pain relief from post-herpetic neuralgia, HIV-neuropathy, and diabetic neuropathy.

Although capsaicin creams have been used to treat psoriasis for reduction of itching, a review of six clinical trials involving topical capsaicin for treatment of pruritus concluded there was insufficient evidence of effect. Capsaicin decreases LDL cholesterol levels moderately.

There is insufficient clinical evidence to determine the role of ingested capsaicin on several human disorders, including obesity, diabetes, cancer and cardiovascular diseases.

Pepper spray and pests
Capsaicinoids are also an active ingredient in riot control and personal defense pepper spray agents. When the spray comes in contact with skin, especially eyes or mucous membranes, it produces pain and breathing difficulty in the affected individual.

Capsaicin is also used to deter pests, specifically mammalian pests.  Targets of capsaicin repellants include voles, deer, rabbits, squirrels, bears, insects, and attacking dogs.  Ground or crushed dried chili pods may be used in birdseed to deter rodents, taking advantage of the insensitivity of birds to capsaicin.  The Elephant Pepper Development Trust claims that using chili peppers as a barrier crop can be a sustainable means for rural African farmers to deter elephants from eating their crops.

An article published in the Journal of Environmental Science and Health Part B in 2006 states that "Although hot chili pepper extract is commonly used as a component of household and garden insect-repellent formulas, it is not clear that the capsaicinoid elements of the extract are responsible for its repellency."

The first pesticide product using solely capsaicin as the active ingredient was registered with the U.S. Department of Agriculture in 1962.

Equestrian sports
Capsaicin is a banned substance in equestrian sports because of its hypersensitizing and pain-relieving properties. At the show jumping events of the 2008 Summer Olympics, four horses tested positive for capsaicin, which resulted in disqualification.

Toxicity

Acute health effects
Capsaicin is a strong irritant requiring proper protective goggles, respirators, and proper hazardous material-handling procedures. Capsaicin takes effect upon skin contact (irritant, sensitizer), eye contact (irritant), ingestion, and inhalation (lung irritant, lung sensitizer).  in mice is 47.2 mg/kg.

Painful exposures to capsaicin-containing peppers are among the most common plant-related exposures presented to poison centers. They cause burning or stinging pain to the skin and, if ingested in large amounts by adults or small amounts by children, can produce nausea, vomiting, abdominal pain, and burning diarrhea. Eye exposure produces intense tearing, pain, conjunctivitis, and blepharospasm.

Treatment after exposure
The primary treatment is removal from exposure. Contaminated clothing should be removed and placed in airtight bags before incineration to prevent secondary exposure.

For external exposure, bathing the mucous membrane surfaces that have contacted capsaicin with oily compounds such as vegetable oil, paraffin oil, petroleum jelly (Vaseline), creams, or polyethylene glycol is the most effective way to attenuate the associated discomfort; since oil and capsaicin are both hydrophobic hydrocarbons, the capsaicin that has not already been absorbed into tissues will be picked up into solution and easily removed. Capsaicin can also be washed off the skin using soap, shampoo, or other detergents. Plain water is ineffective at removing capsaicin. Capsaicin is soluble in alcohol, which can be used to clean contaminated items.

The burning sensation will slowly fade away over several hours if no actions are taken.

Capsaicin-induced asthma might be treated with oral antihistamines or corticosteroids.

Weight loss and regain

As of 2007, there was no evidence showing that weight loss is directly correlated with ingesting capsaicin. Well-designed clinical research had not been performed because the pungency of capsaicin in prescribed doses under research prevented subjects from complying in the study.  A 2014 meta-analysis of further trials found weak evidence that consuming capsaicin before a meal might slightly reduce the amount of food consumed, and might drive food preference toward carbohydrates.

Peptic ulcer 
One 2006 review concluded that capsaicin may relieve symptoms of a peptic ulcer rather than being a cause of it.

Mechanism of action
The burning and painful sensations associated with capsaicin result from its chemical interaction with sensory neurons. Capsaicin, as a member of the vanilloid family, binds to a receptor called the vanilloid receptor subtype 1 (TRPV1). First cloned in 1997, TRPV1 is an ion channel-type receptor. TRPV1, which can also be stimulated with heat, protons and physical abrasion, permits cations to pass through the cell membrane when activated. The resulting depolarization of the neuron stimulates it to signal the brain. By binding to the TRPV1 receptor, the capsaicin molecule produces similar sensations to those of excessive heat or abrasive damage, explaining why the spiciness of capsaicin is described as a burning sensation.

Early research showed capsaicin to evoke a long-onset current in comparison to other chemical agonists, suggesting the involvement of a significant rate-limiting factor. There are a number of different TRP ion channels that have been shown to be sensitive to different ranges of temperature and probably are responsible for the human range of temperature sensation. Thus, capsaicin gives a sensation similar to a chemical burn, or indeed any direct tissue damage at all, when chili peppers are the source of exposure. The inflammation resulting from exposure to capsaicin is believed to be the result of the body's reaction. Capsaicin is however a neurotoxin that can cause degeneration of sensory neurons. But the mode of action of capsaicin in inducing bronchoconstriction is thought to involve stimulation of C fibers culminating in the release of neuropeptides. In essence, the body inflames tissues as if it has undergone a burn or abrasion and the resulting inflammation can cause tissue damage in cases of extreme exposure, as is the case for many substances that cause the body to trigger an inflammatory response.

Capsaicin was instrumental in the 2021 Nobel Prize in Physiology or Medicine, as it had led to the discovery of receptors for temperature and touch.

History
The compound was first extracted in impure form in 1816 by Christian Friedrich Bucholz (1770–1818).  He called it "capsicin", after the genus Capsicum from which it was extracted.  John Clough Thresh (1850–1932), who had isolated capsaicin in almost pure form, gave it the name "capsaicin" in 1876.  Karl Micko isolated capsaicin in its pure form in 1898. Capsaicin's chemical composition was first determined in 1919 by E. K. Nelson, who also partially elucidated capsaicin's chemical structure.  Capsaicin was first synthesized in 1930 by Ernst Spath and Stephen F. Darling. In 1961, similar substances were isolated from chili peppers by the Japanese chemists S. Kosuge and Y. Inagaki, who named them capsaicinoids.

In 1873 German pharmacologist Rudolf Buchheim (1820–1879) and in 1878 the Hungarian doctor Endre Hőgyes stated that "capsicol" (partially purified capsaicin) caused the burning feeling when in contact with mucous membranes and increased secretion of gastric acid.

Capsaicinoids

The most commonly occurring capsaicinoids are capsaicin (69%), dihydrocapsaicin (22%),  nordihydrocapsaicin (7%), homocapsaicin (1%), and homodihydrocapsaicin (1%).

Capsaicin and dihydrocapsaicin (both 16.0 million SHU) are the most pungent capsaicinoids. Nordihydrocapsaicin (9.1 million SHU), homocapsaicin and homodihydrocapsaicin (both 8.6 million SHU) are about half as hot.

There are six natural capsaicinoids (table below). Although vanillylamide of n-nonanoic acid (Nonivamide, VNA, also PAVA) is produced synthetically for most applications, it does occur naturally in Capsicum species.

Biosynthesis

History 
The general biosynthetic pathway of capsaicin and other capsaicinoids was elucidated in the 1960s by Bennett and Kirby, and Leete and Louden. Radiolabeling studies identified phenylalanine and valine as the precursors to capsaicin. Enzymes of the phenylpropanoid pathway, phenylalanine ammonia lyase (PAL), cinnamate 4-hydroxylase (C4H), caffeic acid O-methyltransferase (COMT) and their function in capsaicinoid biosynthesis were identified later by Fujiwake et al., and Sukrasno and Yeoman. Suzuki et al. are responsible for identifying leucine as another precursor to the branched-chain fatty acid pathway. It was discovered in 1999 that pungency of chili peppers is related to higher transcription levels of key enzymes of the phenylpropanoid pathway, phenylalanine ammonia lyase, cinnamate 4-hydroxylase, caffeic acid O-methyltransferase. Similar studies showed high transcription levels in the placenta of chili peppers with high pungency of genes responsible for branched-chain fatty acid pathway.

Biosynthetic pathway

Plants exclusively of the genus Capsicum produce capsaicinoids, which are alkaloids.  Capsaicin is believed to be synthesized in the interlocular septum of chili peppers and depends on the gene AT3, which resides at the pun1 locus, and which encodes a putative acyltransferase.

Biosynthesis of the capsaicinoids occurs in the glands of the pepper fruit where capsaicin synthase condenses vanillylamine from the phenylpropanoid pathway with an acyl-CoA moiety produced by the branched-chain fatty acid pathway.

Capsaicin is the most abundant capsaicinoid found in the genus Capsicum, but at least ten other capsaicinoid variants exist. Phenylalanine supplies the precursor to the phenylpropanoid pathway while leucine or valine provide the precursor for the branched-chain fatty acid pathway. To produce capsaicin, 8-methyl-6-nonenoyl-CoA is produced by the branched-chain fatty acid pathway and condensed with vanillamine. Other capsaicinoids are produced by the condensation of vanillamine with various acyl-CoA products from the branched-chain fatty acid pathway, which is capable of producing a variety of acyl-CoA moieties of different chain length and degrees of unsaturation. All condensation reactions between the products of the phenylpropanoid and branched-chain fatty acid pathway are mediated by capsaicin synthase to produce the final capsacinoid product.

See also
 Allicin, the active piquant flavor chemical in uncooked garlic, and to a lesser extent onions (see those articles for discussion of other chemicals in them relating to pungency, and eye irritation)
 Capsazepine, capsaicin antagonist
 Iodoresiniferatoxin, an ultrapotent capsaicin antagonist derived from Resiniferatoxin
 Naga Viper pepper, Bhut Jolokia Pepper, Carolina Reaper, Trinidad Moruga Scorpion; some of the world's most capsaicin-rich fruits

References

Notes

Further reading
 Abdel-Salam, Omar M. E., ed.: Capsaicin as a Therapeutic Molecule. Springer, 2014.  (print);  (eBook).

External links

 Capsaicin General Fact Sheet – National Pesticide Information Center
 Fire and Spice: The molecular basis for flavor

 
CYP3A4 inducers